Elections to the Baseball Hall of Fame for 1974 followed the system in place since 1971. 
The Baseball Writers' Association of America (BBWAA) voted by mail to select from recent major league players and elected two, Whitey Ford and Mickey Mantle. The Veterans Committee met in closed sessions to consider executives, managers, umpires, and earlier major league players. It selected three people: Jim Bottomley, Jocko Conlan, and Sam Thompson. The Negro Leagues Committee also met in person and selected Cool Papa Bell. A formal induction ceremony was held in Cooperstown, New York, on August 12, 1974, with Commissioner of Baseball Bowie Kuhn presiding.

BBWAA election

The BBWAA was authorized to elect players active in 1954 or later, but not after 1968; the ballot included candidates from the 1973 ballot who received at least 5% of the vote but were not elected, along with selected players, chosen by a screening committee, whose last appearance was in 1968. All 10-year members of the BBWAA were eligible to vote.

Voters were instructed to cast votes for up to 10 candidates; any candidate receiving votes on at least 75% of the ballots would be honored with induction to the Hall. The ballot consisted of 42 players; a total of 365 ballots were cast, with 274 votes required for election. A total of 3,000 individual votes were cast, an average of 8.22 per ballot.

Candidates who were eligible for the first time are indicated here with dagger (†). The two candidates who received at least 75% of the vote and were elected are indicated in bold italics; candidates who have since been elected in subsequent elections are indicated in italics.

Allie Reynolds was on the ballot for the final time.

The newly-eligible players included 9 All-Stars, 4 of whom were not included on the ballot, representing a total of 75 All-Star selections. Among the new candidates were 20-time All-Star Mickey Mantle, 12-time All-Stars Elston Howard and Eddie Mathews, 9-time All-Star Rocky Colavito, 7-time All-Star Roger Maris and 5-time All-Star Larry Jackson.

Players eligible for the first time who were not included on the ballot were: John Buzhardt, Wayne Causey, Lenny Green, Larry Jackson, Stu Miller, Bill Monbouquette, Russ Nixon, Larry Sherry, Norm Siebern, Bobby Tiefenauer and John Tsitouris.

J. G. Taylor Spink Award 
Warren Brown (1894–1978), John Drebinger (1891–1979) and John Kieran (1892–1981) received the J. G. Taylor Spink Award honoring baseball writers. The awards were voted at the December 1973 meeting of the BBWAA, and included in the summer 1974 ceremonies.

References

External links
1974 Election at www.baseballhalloffame.org

Baseball Hall of Fame balloting
Hall of Fame balloting